The state anthem of the Republic of Kalmykia is the regional anthem of the Republic of Kalmykia, a federal subject of Russia. It was composed by Arkadiy Mandzhiyev and written by Vera Shugrayeva.

History
The Supreme Council of the Republic of Kalmykia announced the proclamation of the sovereignty of the republic in October 1990. On the 18th, the Supreme Council of the Kalmyk Autonomous SSR adopted the Declaration on State Sovereignty, according to which the Kalmyk ASSR became the Kalmyk SSR. Reflections on the coat of arms and the flag did not find this change. By resolution of the Supreme Council of 20 February 1992, No. 336-IX, the Kalmyk SSR was renamed the Republic of Kalmykia. In accordance with the Decree of the Presidium of the Supreme Council of the Kalmyk SSR from 7 June 1991, No. 243-P -1X, a competition was announced in the republic to create new state symbols of the Kalmyk SSR.

As a result, the Supreme Council of Kalmykia approved the anthem on 30 October 1992, along with its music and lyrics. The anthem was also approved by the separate Law of the Republic of Kalmykia of 4 November 1992 "On the Supplement of the Constitution (Basic Law) of the Kalmyk SSR Article 158-1".

Lyrics

Regulations
The order, place and time of execution of the anthem are defined by the Law of the Republic of Kalmykia of 11 June 1996 No. 44-I-3 "On State Symbols of the Republic of Kalmykia". According to Art. 16 of said Law, the anthem is performed during solemn ceremonies and other events held by state bodies when raising the national flag. After a newly appointed Head takes oath, the anthem is played right after. The anthem can also be played during openings of ceremonial meetings of the Parliament (e.g. People's Khural of Kalmykia) and during openings of memorials and monuments. It can be played during visits by highest officials of Russia (or its federal subjects), the CIS, and other countries (after their anthems have been played). "Khalmg Tanghchin chastr" is also played while state awards are being presented, and played during the openings and closings of solemn rallies, meetings, in honour of sports teams, and official celebrations. Additionally, the anthem can be played while laying wreaths to the graves of victims of political repression and those killed in the defense of their ethnic homeland.

See also
Anthem of the Republic of Buryatia
National anthem of Mongolia
List of national anthems

External links
 National Anthems Forum
 Instrumental rendition with photos
 Vocal recording in Kalmyk

Notes

References

Regional songs
Kalmykia
Kalmyk language
Russian anthems
National anthem compositions in E major
European anthems